The Symphony No. 3 in E major, K. 18, formerly misattributed to Wolfgang Amadeus Mozart, is a symphony composed by Carl Friedrich Abel, a leading German composer of the earlier Classical period.

It was misattributed to Mozart because a manuscript score in the hand of Mozart was categorized as his Symphony No. 3 and was published as such in the first complete edition of Mozart's works by Breitkopf & Härtel. Later, it was discovered that this symphony was actually the work of Abel, copied by the boy Mozart (evidently for study purposes) while he was visiting London in 1764. That symphony was originally published as the concluding work in Abel's Six Symphonies, Op. 7. Mozart's copy differs from Abel's published score in that Mozart used clarinets as replacements for the oboes.

It is in three movements:

Molto allegro
Andante
Presto

References

External links 

03
Compositions in E-flat major
Mozart: spurious and doubtful works